Durham is a surname. Notable people with the surname include:

Bartlett S. Durham (1824–1859), American physician and the namesake of Durham, North Carolina
Carl T. Durham (1892–1974) was an American politician who served as a member of the United States House of Representatives from North Carolina.
David Anthony Durham (born 1969), American novelist
Edward B. Durham (c. 1870 – c. 1930), American mining engineer and Professor
Florence Margaret Durham (1869–1949), British geneticist
Geoffrey Durham (born 1949), British comedy magician and actor
Hugh Durham (born 1937), American college basketball coach
Jim Durham (1947–2012), American sportscaster
Jimmie Durham (1940–2021), American sculptor and poet
John Durham (disambiguation), multiple people
Judith Durham (1943–2022), Australian singer, member of The Seekers
Leon Durham (born 1957), American baseball player
Payne Durham (born 2000), American football player
Philip Charles Durham (1763–1845), British admiral who fought at the Battle of Trafalgar
Ray Durham (born 1971), American baseball player
Rhea Durham (born 1978), American fashion model
Ron Durham (1921–2021), Australian rules footballer
Walter T. Durham (1924–2013), American historian
Woody Durham (1941–2018), American radio announcer